Ablechrus is a genus of beetles belonging to the family Melyridae.

The species of this genus are found in America.

Species:
 Ablechrus caravellae Constantin, 2012
 Ablechrus moulini Constantin, 2017

References

Melyridae
Cleroidea genera